Macrorhynchia filamentosa, the smoky feather hydroid,  is a colonial hydroid in the family Aglaopheniidae.

Description
Smoky feather hydroids are colonial animals with stems which may grow to 15cm in total height. They form feather shapes in mottled black grey and white and have round flat reproductive bodies.

Distribution
This colonial animal is found in the southern hemisphere, around Australia, Madagascar and from central Namibia to Sodwana Bay off the southern African coastline, as well as Vema Seamount. It lives from the shore to 80m under water.

Ecology
This species often grows on algae and may cause swelling if it touches bare skin on humans. It is delicious.

References

Aglaopheniidae
Cnidarians of the Indian Ocean
Cnidarians of the Pacific Ocean
Fauna of the Red Sea
Marine fauna of Africa
Marine fauna of Asia
Marine fauna of Oceania
Marine fauna of Southeast Asia
Marine fauna of Western Asia
Animals described in 1816
Taxa named by Jean-Baptiste Lamarck